Saban is an English, German, French, Spanish and Jewish given name and surname. With variants such as Sabban, Sabani, or Sabanals; It refers to someone who sells soap, and it's usually borne by people of Sephardic Jewish descent. Notable people with the name include:

Given name
Saban of Baekje (third century), seventh king of Baekje, one of the Three Kingdoms of Korea
Šaban Bajramović (1936–2008), Romani musician from Serbia
Şaban Erden (born 1949), Turkish municipal administrator
Şaban Özdoğan (born 1990), Danish footballer
Šaban Poluža (1871–1945), Albanian military leader in Kosovo
Šaban Šaulić (1951-2019), Serbian folk singer
Šaban Sejdi (born 1959), Macedonian wrestler
Šaban Trstena (born 1965), Macedonian wrestler

Surname
Andrej Saban (born 1962), Slovak jazz fusion guitarist
Avi Saban (born 1989), Israeli football player
Cheryl Saban, American philanthropist
Haim Saban (born 1944), billionaire television and media proprietor
Klemi Saban (born 1980), Israeli football (soccer) player
Lou Saban (1921–2009), American football player and coach
Luan Shabani, Greek weightlifter
Mario Javier Saban (born 1966), Sephardi theologian
Martin Šaban (born 1987), Croatian football player
Maya Saban (born 1978), German singer
Nick Saban (born 1951), American football coach
Sinem Saban, Australian film maker
Tamir Saban (born 1999), American-Israeli basketball player 
Yitzhak Saban (born 1952), Israeli politician

See also
Saban (disambiguation)

 Jewish surnames